The Voice Festival UK (VF-UK) is a UK arts education charity dedicated to providing opportunities to get involved with contemporary a cappella, unaccompanied singing.

The Voice Festival's central purpose is to increase the awareness and popularity of the a cappella art form in the UK, and to support the development of the existing UK a cappella scene, by recruiting and encouraging new participants, developing new audiences, supporting and educating existing participants and building UK a cappella communities.

History 
Founded in 2008, the Voice Festival UK was conceived by two a cappella singers from the University of Oxford, who wanted to help support and develop the growing a cappella scene in the UK. In its infancy, the Voice Festival offered a competition for university a cappella groups alongside workshops, and had around eight participating groups.

Still run by a growing team of volunteers, the organisation has increased its offering year on year, and now offers a series of workshops, masterclasses, concerts, competitions and networking events for singers of all ages across three separate programmes: youth, university and community. Events takes place throughout the year, with highlights being the annual Festival Weekend in Spring, and a showcase at the Edinburgh Fringe Festival in August.

From 2009 to 2010, there were three regional rounds of the Festival, held in Oxford, Cambridge and St Andrews. In 2011, two new regional rounds were added in London and Birmingham. In 2012, the Cambridge round was scrapped due to lack of participants, but was replaced by a round in Bristol. This year also saw youth and community categories added to the competition. In 2014, regional rounds were replaced by a single video round. 

On three occasions, the winners of the annual university competition have been invited to perform at the ICCA final in New York. In 2009, Out of the Blue came second in the finals. The 2010 winners, The Oxford Gargoyles, were unable to compete in the final in New York due to the University of Oxford's exam timetable. Cadenza competed in the ICCA finals in New York in 2011 but did not place.

Discography 
The Voice Festival UK has released two compilation albums, showcasing cover songs arranged and performed by both professional and amateur a cappella artists from across the UK. The Voice Collection 2013 was released at the London A Cappella Festival. The Voice Collection II arrived three years later, released at the 2016 Festival Weekend.

The Voice Collection 2013

The Voice Collection II

Results of the University Competition

2009–2013

2014–present 
The 2014 competition saw a change in format, in which the regional rounds were scrapped, and competitors applied for the competition via video entry, from which 12 groups were taken through to a 'semi-final', and then five groups went through to the final. This allowed more groups to apply, and ensured that all groups were judged fairly and equally by one set of judges.

Results of the Youth Competition

Results of the Community Competition

References

External links 
 The Voice Festival Official Website
 The Voice Festival on YouTube

Singing competitions
Music festivals in the United Kingdom